Bröder may refer to:

Bröder (album), 1998 by Swedish band Sten & Stanley
"Bröder", 2014 song by Swedish singer Linus Svenning
Mirko Bröder (1911–1943), Hungarian–Serbian chess master
Iris Mai (née Bröder; born 1962), German chess master

See also
Broder